Statistics of Swedish football Division 3 for the 1948–49 season.

League standings

Norra 1948–49

Östra 1948–49

Västra 1948–49

Södra 1948–49

Footnotes

References 

Swedish Football Division 3 seasons
3
Swed